Justinian I (48214 November 565), also known as Justinian the Great, was the Eastern Roman emperor from 527 to 565.

His reign is marked by the ambitious but only partly realized renovatio imperii, or "restoration of the Empire". This ambition was expressed by the partial recovery of the territories of the defunct Western Roman Empire. His general, Belisarius, swiftly conquered the Vandal Kingdom in North Africa. Subsequently, Belisarius, Narses, and other generals conquered the Ostrogothic kingdom, restoring Dalmatia, Sicily, Italy, and Rome to the empire after more than half a century of rule by the Ostrogoths. The praetorian prefect Liberius reclaimed the south of the Iberian peninsula, establishing the province of Spania. These campaigns re-established Roman control over the western Mediterranean, increasing the Empire's annual revenue by over a million solidi. During his reign, Justinian also subdued the Tzani, a people on the east coast of the Black Sea that had never been under Roman rule before. He engaged the Sasanian Empire in the east during Kavad I's reign, and later again during Khosrow I's reign; this second conflict was partially initiated due to his ambitions in the west.

A still more resonant aspect of his legacy was the uniform rewriting of Roman law, the Corpus Juris Civilis, which is still the basis of civil law in many modern states. His reign also marked a blossoming of Eastern Roman (Byzantine) culture, and his building program yielded works such as the Hagia Sophia.

Life

Justinian was born in Tauresium, Dardania, probably in 482. A native speaker of Latin (possibly the last Roman emperor to be one), he came from a peasant family believed to have been of Illyro-Roman or Thraco-Roman origin. The name Iustinianus, which he took later, is indicative of adoption by his uncle Justin. During his reign, he founded Justiniana Prima not far from his birthplace. His mother was Vigilantia, the sister of Justin. Justin, who was commander of one of the imperial guard units (the Excubitors) before he became emperor, adopted Justinian, brought him to Constantinople, and ensured the boy's education. As a result, Justinian was well educated in jurisprudence, theology, and Roman history. Justinian served as a candidatus, one of 40 men selected from the scholae palatinae to serve as the emperor's personal bodyguard. The chronicler John Malalas, who lived during the reign of Justinian, describes his appearance as short, fair-skinned, curly-haired, round-faced, and handsome. Another contemporary historian, Procopius, compares Justinian's appearance to that of tyrannical Emperor Domitian, although this is probably slander.

When Emperor Anastasius died in 518, Justin was proclaimed the new emperor with significant help from Justinian. Justinian showed a lot of ambition, and several sources claim that he was functioning as virtual regent long before Justin made him associate emperor, although there is no conclusive evidence of this. As Justin became senile near the end of his reign, Justinian became the de facto ruler. Following the general Vitalian's assassination in 520 (orchestrated by Justinian and Justin), Justinian was appointed consul and commander of the army of the east. Justinian remained Justin's close confidant, and in 525 was granted the titles of nobilissimus and caesar (heir-apparent). He was crowned co-emperor on 1 April 527, and became sole ruler after Justin's death on 1 August 527.

As a ruler, Justinian showed great energy. He was known as "the emperor who never sleeps" for his work habits. Nevertheless, he seems to have been amiable and easy to approach. Around 525, he married his mistress, Theodora, in Constantinople. She was by profession an actress and some twenty years his junior. In earlier times, Justinian could not have married her owing to her class, but his uncle, Emperor Justin I, had passed a law lifting restrictions on marriages with ex-actresses. Though the marriage caused a scandal, Theodora would become very influential in the politics of the Empire. Other talented individuals included Tribonian, his legal adviser; Peter the Patrician, the diplomat and long-time head of the palace bureaucracy; Justinian's finance ministers John the Cappadocian and Peter Barsymes, who managed to collect taxes more efficiently than any before, thereby funding Justinian's wars; and finally, his prodigiously talented generals, Belisarius and Narses.

Justinian's rule was not universally popular; early in his reign he nearly lost his throne during the Nika riots, and a conspiracy against the emperor's life by dissatisfied businessmen was discovered as late as 562. Justinian was struck by the plague in the early 540s but recovered. Theodora died in 548 at a relatively young age, possibly of cancer; Justinian outlived her by nearly twenty years. Justinian, who had always had a keen interest in theological matters and actively participated in debates on Christian doctrine, became even more devoted to religion during the later years of his life. He died on 14 November 565, childless. He was succeeded by Justin II, who was the son of his sister Vigilantia and married to Sophia, the niece of Theodora. Justinian's body was entombed in a specially built mausoleum in the Church of the Holy Apostles until it was desecrated and robbed during the pillage of the city in 1204 by the Latin States of the Fourth Crusade.

Reign

Legislative activities

Justinian achieved lasting fame through his judicial reforms, particularly through the complete revision of all Roman law, something that had not previously been attempted. The total of Justinian's legislation is known today as the Corpus juris civilis. It consists of the Codex Justinianeus, the Digesta or Pandectae, the Institutiones, and the Novellae.

Early in his reign, Justinian had appointed the quaestor Tribonian to oversee this task. The first draft of the Codex Justinianeus, a codification of imperial constitutions from the 2nd century onward, was issued on 7 April 529. (The final version appeared in 534.) It was followed by the Digesta (or Pandectae), a compilation of older legal texts, in 533, and by the Institutiones, a textbook explaining the principles of law. The Novellae, a collection of new laws issued during Justinian's reign, supplements the Corpus. As opposed to the rest of the corpus, the Novellae appeared in Greek, the common language of the Eastern Empire.

The Corpus forms the basis of Latin jurisprudence (including ecclesiastical Canon Law) and, for historians, provides a valuable insight into the concerns and activities of the later Roman Empire. As a collection it gathers together the many sources in which the leges (laws) and the other rules were expressed or published: proper laws, senatorial consults (senatusconsulta), imperial decrees, case law, and jurists' opinions and interpretations (responsa prudentium).
Tribonian's code ensured the survival of Roman law. It formed the basis of later Byzantine law, as expressed in the Basilika of Basil I and Leo VI the Wise. The only western province where the Justinianic code was introduced was Italy (after the conquest by the so-called Pragmatic Sanction of 554), from where it was to pass to Western Europe in the 12th century and become the basis of much Continental European law code, which was eventually spread by European empires to the Americas and beyond in the Age of Discovery. It eventually passed to Eastern Europe where it appeared in Slavic editions, and it also passed on to Russia. It remains influential to this day.

He passed laws to protect prostitutes from exploitation and women from being forced into prostitution. Rapists were treated severely. Further, by his policies: women charged with major crimes should be guarded by other women to prevent sexual abuse; if a woman was widowed, her dowry should be returned; and a husband could not take on a major debt without his wife giving her consent twice.

Family legislation also revealed a greater concern for the interests of children. This was particularly so with respect to children born out of wedlock. The law under Justinian also reveals a striking interest in child neglect issues. Justinian protected the rights of children whose parents remarried and produced more offspring, or who simply separated and abandoned their offspring, forcing them to beg.

Justinian discontinued the regular appointment of Consuls in 541.

Nika riots

Justinian's habit of choosing efficient but unpopular advisers nearly cost him his throne early in his reign. In January 532, partisans of the chariot racing factions in Constantinople, normally rivals, united against Justinian in a revolt that has become known as the Nika riots. They forced him to dismiss Tribonian and two of his other ministers, and then attempted to overthrow Justinian himself and replace him with the senator Hypatius, who was a nephew of the late emperor Anastasius. While the crowd was rioting in the streets, Justinian considered fleeing the capital by sea, but eventually decided to stay, apparently on the prompting of his wife Theodora, who refused to leave. In the next two days, he ordered the brutal suppression of the riots by his generals Belisarius and Mundus. Procopius relates that 30,000 unarmed civilians were killed in the Hippodrome. On Theodora's insistence, and apparently against his own judgment, Justinian had Anastasius' nephews executed.

The destruction that took place during the revolt provided Justinian with an opportunity to tie his name to a series of splendid new buildings, most notably the architectural innovation of the domed Hagia Sophia.

Military activities

One of the most spectacular features of Justinian's reign was the recovery of large stretches of land around the Western Mediterranean basin that had slipped out of Imperial control in the 5th century. As a Christian Roman emperor, Justinian considered it his divine duty to restore the Roman Empire to its ancient boundaries. Although he never personally took part in military campaigns, he boasted of his successes in the prefaces to his laws and had them commemorated in art. The re-conquests were in large part carried out by his general Belisarius.

War with the Sassanid Empire, 527–532

From his uncle, Justinian inherited ongoing hostilities with the Sassanid Empire. In 530 the Persian forces suffered a double defeat at Dara and Satala, but the next year saw the defeat of Roman forces under Belisarius near Callinicum. Justinian then tried to make alliance with the Axumites of Ethiopia and the Himyarites of Yemen against the Persians, but this failed. When king Kavadh I of Persia died (September 531), Justinian concluded an "Eternal Peace" (which cost him 11,000 pounds of gold) with his successor Khosrau I (532). Having thus secured his eastern frontier, Justinian turned his attention to the West, where Germanic kingdoms had been established in the territories of the former Western Roman Empire.

Conquest of North Africa, 533–534

The first of the western kingdoms Justinian attacked was that of the Vandals in North Africa. King Hilderic, who had maintained good relations with Justinian and the North African Catholic clergy, had been overthrown by his cousin Gelimer in 530 A.D. Imprisoned, the deposed king appealed to Justinian. Justinian protested Gelimer's actions, demanding that Gelimer return the kingdom to Hilderic. Gelimer replied, in effect, that Justinian had no authority to make these demands. Angered at this response, Justinian quickly concluded his ongoing war with the Sassanian Empire and prepared an expedition against the Vandals in 533.

In 533, Belisarius sailed to Africa with a fleet of 92 dromons, escorting 500 transports carrying an army of about 15,000 men, as well as a number of barbarian troops. They landed at Caput Vada (modern Ras Kaboudia) in modern Tunisia. They defeated the Vandals, who were caught completely off guard, at Ad Decimum on 14 September 533 and Tricamarum in December; Belisarius took Carthage. King Gelimer fled to Mount Pappua in Numidia, but surrendered the next spring. He was taken to Constantinople, where he was paraded in a triumph. Sardinia and Corsica, the Balearic Islands, and the stronghold Septem Fratres near Mons Calpe (later named Gibraltar) were recovered in the same campaign.

In this war, the contemporary Procopius remarks that Africa was so entirely depopulated that a person might travel several days without meeting a human being, and he adds, "it is no exaggeration to say, that in the course of the war 5,000,000 perished by the sword, and famine, and pestilence."

An African prefecture, centered in Carthage, was established in April 534, but it would teeter on the brink of collapse during the next 15 years, amidst warfare with the Moors and military mutinies. The area was not completely pacified until 548, but remained peaceful thereafter and enjoyed a measure of prosperity. The recovery of Africa cost the empire about 100,000 pounds of gold.

War in Italy, first phase, 535–540

As in Africa, dynastic struggles in Ostrogothic Italy provided an opportunity for intervention. The young king Athalaric had died on 2 October 534, and a usurper, Theodahad, had imprisoned queen Amalasuintha, Theodoric's daughter and mother of Athalaric, on the island of Martana in Lake Bolsena, where he had her assassinated in 535. Thereupon Belisarius, with 7,500 men, invaded Sicily (535) and advanced into Italy, sacking Naples and capturing Rome on 9 December 536. By that time Theodahad had been deposed by the Ostrogothic army, who had elected Vitigis as their new king. He gathered a large army and besieged Rome from February 537 to March 538 without being able to retake the city.

Justinian sent another general, Narses, to Italy, but tensions between Narses and Belisarius hampered the progress of the campaign. Milan was taken, but was soon recaptured and razed by the Ostrogoths. Justinian recalled Narses in 539. By then the military situation had turned in favour of the Romans, and in 540 Belisarius reached the Ostrogothic capital Ravenna. There he was offered the title of Western Roman Emperor by the Ostrogoths at the same time that envoys of Justinian were arriving to negotiate a peace that would leave the region north of the Po River in Gothic hands. Belisarius feigned acceptance of the offer, entered the city in May 540, and reclaimed it for the Empire. Then, having been recalled by Justinian, Belisarius returned to Constantinople, taking the captured Vitigis and his wife Matasuntha with him.

War with the Sassanid Empire, 540–562

Belisarius had been recalled in the face of renewed hostilities by the Persians. Following a revolt against the Empire in Armenia in the late 530s and possibly motivated by the pleas of Ostrogothic ambassadors, King Khosrau I broke the "Eternal Peace" and invaded Roman territory in the spring of 540. He first sacked Beroea and then Antioch (allowing the garrison of 6,000 men to leave the city), besieged Daras, and then went on to attack the Byzantine base in the small but strategically significant satellite kingdom of Lazica near the Black Sea as requested by its discontented king Gubazes, exacting tribute from the towns he passed along his way. He forced Justinian I to pay him 5,000 pounds of gold, plus 500 pounds of gold more each year.

Belisarius arrived in the East in 541, but after some success, was again recalled to Constantinople in 542. The reasons for his withdrawal are not known, but it may have been instigated by rumours of his disloyalty reaching the court.
The outbreak of the plague coupled with a rebellion in Persia brought Khosrow I's offensives to a halt. Exploiting this, Justinian ordered all the forces in the East to invade Persian Armenia, but the 30,000-strong Byzantine force was defeated by a small force at Anglon. The next year, Khosrau unsuccessfully besieged the major city of Edessa. Both parties made little headway, and in 545 a truce was agreed upon for the southern part of the Roman-Persian frontier. After that, the Lazic War in the North continued for several years: the Lazic king switched to the Byzantine side, and in 549 Justinian sent Dagisthaeus to recapture Petra, but he faced heavy resistance and the siege was relieved by Sasanian reinforcements. Justinian replaced him with Bessas, who was under a cloud after the loss of Rome in 546, but he managed to capture and dismantle Petra in 551. The war continued for several years until a second truce in 557, followed by a Fifty Years' Peace in 562. Under its terms, the Persians agreed to abandon Lazica in exchange for an annual tribute of 400 or 500 pounds of gold (30,000 solidi) to be paid by the Romans.

War in Italy, second phase, 541–554
While military efforts were directed to the East, the situation in Italy took a turn for the worse. Under their respective kings Ildibad and Eraric (both murdered in 541) and especially Totila, the Ostrogoths made quick gains. After a victory at Faenza in 542, they reconquered the major cities of Southern Italy and soon held almost the entire Italian peninsula. Belisarius was sent back to Italy late in 544 but lacked sufficient troops and supplies. Making no headway, he was relieved of his command in 548. Belisarius succeeded in defeating a Gothic fleet of 200 ships. During this period the city of Rome changed hands three more times, first taken and depopulated by the Ostrogoths in December 546, then reconquered by the Byzantines in 547, and then again by the Goths in January 550. Totila also plundered Sicily and attacked Greek coastlines.

Finally, Justinian dispatched a force of approximately 35,000 men (2,000 men were detached and sent to invade southern Visigothic Hispania) under the command of Narses. The army reached Ravenna in June 552 and defeated the Ostrogoths decisively within a month at the battle of Busta Gallorum in the Apennines, where Totila was slain. After a second battle at Mons Lactarius in October that year, the resistance of the Ostrogoths was finally broken. In 554, a large-scale Frankish invasion was defeated at Casilinum, and Italy was secured for the Empire, though it would take Narses several years to reduce the remaining Gothic strongholds. At the end of the war, Italy was garrisoned with an army of 16,000 men. The recovery of Italy cost the empire about 300,000 pounds of gold. Procopius estimated 15,000,000 Goths died.

Other campaigns

In addition to the other conquests, the Empire established a presence in Visigothic Hispania, when the usurper Athanagild requested assistance in his rebellion against King Agila I. In 552, Justinian dispatched a force of 2,000 men; according to the historian Jordanes, this army was led by the octogenarian Liberius. The Byzantines took Cartagena and other cities on the southeastern coast and founded the new province of Spania before being checked by their former ally Athanagild, who had by now become king. This campaign marked the apogee of Byzantine expansion.

During Justinian's reign, the Balkans suffered from several incursions by the Turkic and Slavic peoples who lived north of the Danube. Here, Justinian resorted mainly to a combination of diplomacy and a system of defensive works. In 559 a particularly dangerous invasion of Sklavinoi and Kutrigurs under their khan Zabergan threatened Constantinople, but they were repulsed by the aged general Belisarius.

Results
Justinian's ambition to restore the Roman Empire to its former glory was only partly realized. In the West, the brilliant early military successes of the 530s were followed by years of stagnation. The dragging war with the Goths was a disaster for Italy, even though its long-lasting effects may have been less severe than is sometimes thought. The heavy taxes that the administration imposed upon Italian population were deeply resented.

The final victory in Italy and the conquest of Africa and the coast of southern Hispania significantly enlarged the area of Byzantine influence and eliminated all naval threats to the empire, which in 555 reached its territorial zenith. Despite losing much of Italy soon after Justinian's death, the empire retained several important cities, including Rome, Naples, and Ravenna, leaving the Lombards as a regional threat. The newly founded province of Spania kept the Visigoths as a threat to Hispania alone and not to the western Mediterranean and Africa.

Events of the later years of his reign showed that Constantinople itself was not safe from barbarian incursions from the north, and even the relatively benevolent historian Menander Protector felt the need to attribute the Emperor's failure to protect the capital to the weakness of his body in his old age. In his efforts to renew the Roman Empire, Justinian dangerously stretched its resources while failing to take into account the changed realities of 6th-century Europe.

Religious activities
Justinian saw the orthodoxy of his empire threatened by diverging religious currents, especially Monophysitism, which had many adherents in the eastern provinces of Syria and Egypt. Monophysite doctrine, which maintains that Jesus Christ had one divine nature rather than a synthesis of divine and human nature, had been condemned as a heresy by the Council of Chalcedon in 451, and the tolerant policies towards Monophysitism of Zeno and Anastasius I had been a source of tension in the relationship with the bishops of Rome. Justin reversed this trend and confirmed the Chalcedonian doctrine, openly condemning the Monophysites. Justinian, who continued this policy, tried to impose religious unity on his subjects by forcing them to accept doctrinal compromises that might appeal to all parties, a policy that proved unsuccessful as he satisfied none of them.

Near the end of his life, Justinian became ever more inclined towards the Monophysite doctrine, especially in the form of Aphthartodocetism, but he died before being able to issue any legislation. The empress Theodora sympathized with the Monophysites and is said to have been a constant source of pro-Monophysite intrigues at the court in Constantinople in the earlier years. In the course of his reign, Justinian, who had a genuine interest in matters of theology, authored a small number of theological treatises.

Religious policy
As in his secular administration, despotism appeared also in the Emperor's ecclesiastical policy. He regulated everything, both in religion and in law. At the very beginning of his reign, he deemed it proper to promulgate by law the Church's belief in the Trinity and the Incarnation, and to threaten all heretics with the appropriate penalties, whereas he subsequently declared that he intended to deprive all disturbers of orthodoxy of the opportunity for such offense by due process of law. He made the Nicaeno-Constantinopolitan creed the sole symbol of the Church and accorded legal force to the canons of the four ecumenical councils. The bishops in attendance at the Council of Constantinople (536) recognized that nothing could be done in the Church contrary to the emperor's will and command, while, on his side, the emperor, in the case of the Patriarch Anthimus, reinforced the ban of the Church with temporal proscription. Justinian protected the purity of the church by suppressing heretics. He neglected no opportunity to secure the rights of the Church and clergy, and to protect and extend monasticism. He granted the monks the right to inherit property from private citizens and the right to receive solemnia, or annual gifts, from the Imperial treasury or from the taxes of certain provinces and he prohibited lay confiscation of monastic estates.

Although the despotic character of his measures is contrary to modern sensibilities, he was indeed a "nursing father" of the Church. Both the Codex and the Novellae contain many enactments regarding donations, foundations, and the administration of ecclesiastical property; election and rights of bishops, priests and abbots; monastic life, residential obligations of the clergy, conduct of divine service, episcopal jurisdiction, etc. Justinian also rebuilt the Church of Hagia Sophia (which cost 20,000 pounds of gold), the original site having been destroyed during the Nika riots. The new Hagia Sophia, with its numerous chapels and shrines, gilded octagonal dome, and mosaics, became the centre and most visible monument of Eastern Orthodoxy in Constantinople.

Religious relations with Rome
From the middle of the 5th century onward, increasingly arduous tasks confronted the emperors of the East in ecclesiastical matters.
Justinian entered the arena of ecclesiastical statecraft shortly after his uncle's accession in 518, and put an end to the Acacian schism. Previous Emperors had tried to alleviate theological conflicts by declarations that deemphasized the Council of Chalcedon, which had condemned Monophysitism, which had strongholds in Egypt and Syria, and by tolerating the appointment of Monophysites to church offices. The Popes reacted by severing ties with the Patriarch of Constantinople who supported these policies. Emperors Justin I (and later Justinian himself) rescinded these policies and reestablished the union between Constantinople and Rome. After this, Justinian also felt entitled to settle disputes in papal elections, as he did when he favored Vigilius and had his rival Silverius deported.

This new-found unity between East and West did not, however, solve the ongoing disputes in the east. Justinian's policies switched between attempts to force Monophysites and Miaphysites (who were mistaken to be adherers of Monophysitism) to accept the Chalcedonian creed by persecuting their bishops and monks – thereby embittering their sympathizers in Egypt and other provinces – and attempts at a compromise that would win over the Monophysites without surrendering the Chalcedonian faith. Such an approach was supported by the Empress Theodora, who favoured the Miaphysites unreservedly. In the condemnation of the Three Chapters, three theologians that had opposed Monophysitism before and after the Council of Chalcedon, Justinian tried to win over the opposition. At the Fifth Ecumenical Council, most of the Eastern church yielded to the Emperor's demands, and Pope Vigilius, who was forcibly brought to Constantinople and besieged at a chapel, finally also gave his assent. However, the condemnation was received unfavourably in the west, where it led to new (albeit temporal) schism, and failed to reach its goal in the east, as the Monophysites remained unsatisfied – all the more bitter for him because during his last years he took an even greater interest in theological matters.

Authoritarian rule
Justinian's religious policy reflected the Imperial conviction that the unity of the Empire presupposed unity of faith, and it appeared to him obvious that this faith could only be the orthodoxy (Chalcedonian). Those of a different belief were subjected to persecution, which imperial legislation had effected from the time of Constantius II and which would now vigorously continue. The Codex contained two statutes that decreed the total destruction of paganism, even in private life; these provisions were zealously enforced. Contemporary sources (John Malalas, Theophanes, and John of Ephesus) tell of severe persecutions, even of men in high position.

The original Academy of Plato had been destroyed by the Roman dictator Sulla in 86 BC. Several centuries later, in 410 AD, a Neoplatonic Academy was established that had no institutional continuity with Plato's Academy, and which served as a center for Neoplatonism and mysticism. It persisted until 529 AD when it was finally closed by Justinian I. Other schools in Constantinople, Antioch, and Alexandria, which were the centers of Justinian's empire, continued.

In Asia Minor alone, John of Ephesus was reported to have converted 70,000 pagans, which was probably an exaggerated number. Other peoples also accepted Christianity: the Heruli, the Huns dwelling near the Don, the Abasgi, and the Tzanni in Caucasia.

The worship of Amun at the oasis of Awjila in the Libyan desert was abolished, and so were the remnants of the worship of Isis on the island of Philae, at the first cataract of the Nile. The Presbyter Julian and the Bishop Longinus conducted a mission among the Nabataeans, and Justinian attempted to strengthen Christianity in Yemen by dispatching a bishop from Egypt.The civil rights of Jews were restricted and their religious privileges threatened. Justinian also interfered in the internal affairs of the synagogue and encouraged the Jews to use the Greek Septuagint in their synagogues in Constantinople.

The Emperor faced significant opposition from the Samaritans, who resisted conversion to Christianity and were repeatedly in insurrection. He persecuted them with rigorous edicts, but could not prevent reprisals towards Christians from taking place in Samaria toward the close of his reign. The consistency of Justinian's policy meant that the Manicheans too suffered persecution, experiencing both exile and threat of capital punishment. At Constantinople, on one occasion, not a few Manicheans, after strict inquisition, were executed in the emperor's very presence: some by burning, others by drowning.

Architecture, learning, art and literature

Justinian was a prolific builder; the historian Procopius bears witness to his activities in this area. Under Justinian's reign, the San Vitale in Ravenna, which features two famous mosaics representing Justinian and Theodora, was completed under the sponsorship of Julius Argentarius. Most notably, he had the Hagia Sophia, originally a basilica-style church that had been burnt down during the Nika riots, splendidly rebuilt according to a completely different ground plan, under the architectural supervision of Isidore of Miletus and Anthemius of Tralles. On 26 December 537, according to Pseudo-Codinus, Justinian stated at the completion of this edifice: "Solomon, I have outdone thee" (in reference to the first Jewish temple). The church had a second inauguration on 24 December 562, after several reworks made by Isidore the Younger. This new cathedral, with its magnificent dome filled with mosaics, remained the centre of eastern Christianity for centuries.

Another prominent church in the capital, the Church of the Holy Apostles, which had been in a very poor state near the end of the 5th century, was likewise rebuilt. The Church of Saints Sergius and Bacchus, later renamed Little Hagia Sophia, was also built between 532 and 536 by the imperial couple. Works of embellishment were not confined to churches alone: excavations at the site of the Great Palace of Constantinople have yielded several high-quality mosaics dating from Justinian's reign, and a column topped by a bronze statue of Justinian on horseback and dressed in a military costume was erected in the Augustaeum in Constantinople in 543. Rivalry with other, more established patrons from the Constantinopolitan and exiled Roman aristocracy might have enforced Justinian's building activities in the capital as a means of strengthening his dynasty's prestige.

Justinian also strengthened the borders of the Empire from Africa to the East through the construction of fortifications and ensured Constantinople of its water supply through construction of underground cisterns (see Basilica Cistern). To prevent floods from damaging the strategically important border town Dara, an advanced arch dam was built. During his reign the large Sangarius Bridge was built in Bithynia, securing a major military supply route to the east. Furthermore, Justinian restored cities damaged by earthquake or war and built a new city near his place of birth called Justiniana Prima, which was intended to replace Thessalonica as the political and religious centre of Illyricum.

In Justinian's reign, and partly under his patronage, Byzantine culture produced noteworthy historians, including Procopius and Agathias, and poets such as Paul the Silentiary and Romanus the Melodist flourished. On the other hand, centres of learning such as the Neoplatonic Academy in Athens and the famous Law School of Berytus lost their importance during his reign.

Economy and administration

As was the case under Justinian's predecessors, the Empire's economic health rested primarily on agriculture. In addition, long-distance trade flourished, reaching as far north as Cornwall where tin was exchanged for Roman wheat. Within the Empire, convoys sailing from Alexandria provided Constantinople with wheat and grains. Justinian made the traffic more efficient by building a large granary on the island of Tenedos for storage and further transport to Constantinople. Justinian also tried to find new routes for the eastern trade, which was suffering badly from the wars with the Persians.

One important luxury product was silk, which was imported and then processed in the Empire. In order to protect the manufacture of silk products, Justinian granted a monopoly to the imperial factories in 541. In order to bypass the Persian landroute, Justinian established friendly relations with the Abyssinians, whom he wanted to act as trade mediators by transporting Indian silk to the Empire; the Abyssinians, however, were unable to compete with the Persian merchants in India. Then, in the early 550s, two monks succeeded in smuggling eggs of silk worms from Central Asia back to Constantinople, and silk became an indigenous product.

Gold and silver were mined in the Balkans, Anatolia, Armenia, Cyprus, Egypt and Nubia.

At the start of Justinian I's reign he had inherited a surplus 28,800,000 solidi (400,000 pounds of gold) in the imperial treasury from Anastasius I and Justin I. Under Justinian's rule, measures were taken to counter corruption in the provinces and to make tax collection more efficient. Greater administrative power was given to both the leaders of the prefectures and of the provinces, while power was taken away from the vicariates of the dioceses, of which a number were abolished. The overall trend was towards a simplification of administrative infrastructure. According to Brown (1971), the increased professionalization of tax collection did much to destroy the traditional structures of provincial life, as it weakened the autonomy of the town councils in the Greek towns. It has been estimated that before Justinian I's reconquests the state had an annual revenue of 5,000,000 solidi in AD 530, but after his reconquests, the annual revenue was increased to 6,000,000 solidi in AD 550.

Throughout Justinian's reign, the cities and villages of the East thrived, although Antioch was struck by two earthquakes (526, 528) and sacked and evacuated by the Persians (540). Justinian had the city rebuilt, but on a slightly smaller scale.

Despite all these measures, the Empire suffered several major setbacks in the course of the 6th century. The first one was the plague, which lasted from 541 to 543 and, by decimating the Empire's population, probably created a scarcity of labor and a rising of wages. The lack of manpower also led to a significant increase in the number of "barbarians" in the Byzantine armies after the early 540s. The protracted war in Italy and the wars with the Persians themselves laid a heavy burden on the Empire's resources, and Justinian was criticized for curtailing the government-run post service, which he limited to only one eastern route of military importance.

Natural disasters

During the 530s, it seemed to many that God had abandoned the Christian Roman Empire. There were noxious fumes in the air and the Sun, while still providing daylight, refused to give much heat. The extreme weather events of 535–536 led to a famine such as had not been recorded before, affecting both Europe and the Middle East.  These events may have been caused by an atmospheric dust veil resulting from a large volcanic eruption.

The historian Procopius recorded in 536 in his work on the Vandalic War "during this year a most dread portent took place. For the sun gave forth its light without brightness … and it seemed exceedingly like the sun in eclipse, for the beams it shed were not clear".

The causes of these disasters are not precisely known, but volcanoes at the Rabaul caldera, Lake Ilopango, Krakatoa, or, according to a recent finding, in Iceland are suspected.

Seven years later in 542, a devastating outbreak of Bubonic Plague, known as the Plague of Justinian and second only to Black Death of the 14th century, killed tens of millions. Justinian and members of his court, physically unaffected by the previous 535–536 famine, were afflicted, with Justinian himself contracting and surviving the pestilence. The impact of this outbreak of plague has recently been disputed, since evidence for tens of millions dying is uncertain.

In July 551, the eastern Mediterranean was rocked by the 551 Beirut earthquake, which triggered a tsunami. The combined fatalities of both events likely exceeded 30,000, with tremors felt from Antioch to Alexandria.

Cultural depictions
In the Paradiso section of the Divine Comedy, Canto (chapter) VI, by Dante Alighieri, Justinian I is prominently featured as a spirit residing on the sphere of Mercury. The latter holds in Heaven the souls of those whose acts were righteous, yet meant to achieve fame and honor. Justinian's legacy is elaborated on, and he is portrayed as a defender of the Christian faith and the restorer of Rome to the Empire. Justinian confesses that he was partially motivated by fame rather than duty to God, which tainted the justice of his rule in spite of his proud accomplishments. In his introduction, "Cesare fui e son Iustinïano" ("Caesar I was, and am Justinian"), his mortal title is contrasted with his immortal soul, to emphasize that "glory in life is ephemeral, while contributing to God's glory is eternal", according to Dorothy L. Sayers. Dante also uses Justinian to criticize the factious politics of his 14th-century Italy, divided between Ghibellines and Guelphs, in contrast to the unified Italy of the Roman Empire.

Justinian is a major character in the 1938 novel Count Belisarius, by Robert Graves. He is depicted as a jealous and conniving Emperor obsessed with creating and maintaining his own historical legacy.

Justinian appears as a character in the 1939 time travel novel Lest Darkness Fall, by L. Sprague de Camp.

The Glittering Horn: Secret Memoirs of the Court of Justinian was a novel written by Pierson Dixon in 1958 about the court of Justinian.

Justinian occasionally appears in the comic strip Prince Valiant, usually as a nemesis of the title character.

Justinian is played by Innokenty Smoktunovsky in the 1985 Soviet film Primary Russia.

Justinian's Crown is a historical artifact claimed by the Byzantine Empire in the popular 2020 computer strategy game Crusader Kings 3, by Paradox Development Studio.

Historical sources
Procopius provides the primary source for the history of Justinian's reign, but his opinion is tainted by a feeling of betrayal when Justinian became more pragmatic and less idealistic (Justinian and the Later Roman Empire by John W. Barker). He became very bitter towards Justinian and his empress, Theodora. In various Eastern Orthodox Churches, including the Orthodox Church in America, Justinian and his empress Theodora are commemorated on the anniversary of his death, 14 November. Some denominations translate the Julian calendar date to 27 November on the Gregorian calendar. The Calendar of Saints of the Lutheran Church–Missouri Synod and the Lutheran Church–Canada also remember Justinian on 14 November.</ref>

See also

 Church of the Nativity in Bethlehem, rebuilt by Justinian
 International Roman Law Moot Court

Notes

References

 This article incorporates text from the Schaff–Herzog Encyclopedia of Religious Knowledge.

Primary sources
 Procopius, Historia Arcana.
The Anecdota or Secret History. Edited by H. B. Dewing. 7 vols. Loeb Classical Library. Harvard University Press and London, Hutchinson, 1914–40. Greek text and English translation.
Procopii Caesariensis opera omnia. Edited by J. Haury; revised by G. Wirth. 3 vols. Leipzig: Teubner, 1962–64. Greek text.
 The Secret History, translated by G.A. Williamson. Harmondsworth: Penguin Books, 1966. A readable and accessible English translation of the Anecdota.
 John Malalas, Chronicle, translated by Elizabeth Jeffreys, Michael Jeffreys & Roger Scott, 1986. Byzantina Australiensia 4 (Melbourne: Australian Association for Byzantine Studies) 
 Evagrius Scholasticus, Ecclesiastical History, translated by Edward Walford (1846), reprinted 2008. Evolution Publishing, .

Bibliography 

 
 
 
 
 
 
 
 
 
 
 
 
 
 
 
  – German standard work; partially obsolete, but still useful.

External links

 
 St Justinian the Emperor Orthodox Icon and Synaxarion (14 November)
 The Anekdota ("Secret history") of Procopius in English translation.
 Lewis E 244 Infortiatum at OPenn
 The Buildings of Procopius in English translation.
 The Roman Law Library by Professor Yves Lassard and Alexandr Koptev
 Lecture series covering 12 Byzantine Rulers, including Justinian  – by Lars Brownworth
 De Imperatoribus Romanis. An Online Encyclopedia of Roman Emperors
 Reconstruction of column of Justinian in Constantinople
 Opera Omnia by Migne Patrologia Graeca with analytical indexes
 Preface to the Digest of Emperor Justinian
 Annotated Justinian Code (University of Wyoming website)
 Mosaic of Justinian in Hagia Sophia

 
480s births
565 deaths
6th-century Christian saints
6th-century Byzantine emperors
6th-century Roman consuls
Medieval legislators
Burials at the Church of the Holy Apostles
Gothicus Maximus
Thracian people
Illyrian people
Justinian dynasty
Theocrats
Christian royal saints
Pre-Reformation saints of the Lutheran liturgical calendar
People of the Roman–Sasanian Wars
People from Zelenikovo Municipality
Military saints
Last of the Romans
Eastern Orthodox royal saints
Roman Catholic royal saints
Iberian War
Lazic War
Illyrian emperors
6th-century Byzantine people